Yusuf Nurudeen (born 28 August 1992 in Ghana) is a Ghanaian footballer who was last known to have been attached to Medeama SC of the Ghana Premier League.

New radiant

Agreeing to a one-year lone move to 2012 Maldives League title holders New Radiant in summer 2013, Nurudeen made spasmodic appearances for the club including in the quarter final of that year's AFC Cup facing Kuwait SC before being released alongside foreigners Mansa Sylla and Kingsley Nkumureh by December.

References

External links 

 at Soccerway

Association football defenders
Ghanaian footballers
Expatriate footballers in the Maldives
Living people
1992 births
Ghanaian expatriate footballers
Expatriate footballers in Moldova
New Radiant S.C. players